Kanika is a Sanskrit and Pali term referring to a particle or a granule. It is often employed in a religious context in Hinduism, to refer to the practice of leaving a morsel of food as prasadam for a deity, which is deemed to be enough of an offering for their satisfaction.

References

Hinduism
Hindu practices